Margarya melanioides is a species of large operculate freshwater snail, an aquatic gastropod mollusk in the family Viviparidae, the river snails.

Margarya melanioides is the type species of the genus Margarya.

Distribution
The distribution of Margarya melanioides includes Dian Lake, Erhai Lake, Jianhu Lake, Xihu Lake, and Cibi Lake in Yunnan Province, China. Former records in Daduitai Lake and Xingyun Lake are considered as a result of the mix-up of species name.

An average population density was 36 individuals per square meter in Dianchi Lake in 1940s, 0.7 individuals per square meter in 1990s and 0.068 individuals per square meter in Dianchi Lake in 2012.

According to the population ecology research by Song et al. (2013), the population of will collapse in the Dian Lake in 2015.

Description
The width of the shell is up to 64.3 mm. The height of the shell is up to 94.7 mm.

Shu et al. (2010) provided details about the shell and about the radula.

The diploid chromosome number of Margarya melanioides is 2n=18.

Ecology
Margarya melanioides is a dioecious species. Females are ovoviviparous and one female lay 5-6 eggs per year. The newborn shell is about 8 mm in height. The snail will reach maturity in one year in a shell height about 30 mm.

The lifespan is 3–4 years.

Human use
This species is extensively harvested as a human food source, but harvesting is one of its threats.

References

External links

 Zhang L. (1986). "Study on the morphological variation of Margarya melanioides and M. monodi from Dian-Chi, Yunnan." Transactions of the Chinese Society of Malacology 2: 65–71. (In Chinese with English abstract)

Viviparidae
Endemic fauna of Yunnan
Invertebrates of China
Gastropods described in 1877